Ola Snortheim (born December 3, 1954, Harpefoss) is a Norwegian artist and record producer.

Snortheim is the son of the folk-musician Olav Snortheim. Known as one of the most important drummers on the Norwegian rock-scene of the 1980s and 1990s, he has played in many bands, often together with guitarist Jørn Christensen.

The most famous of the rock-bands Snortheim have played in was De Press. The group won the prize Spellemannprisen in the class New Rock in 1981, after releasing the album Block to Block.

Snortheim is the founder of the electronica-group Langsomt Mot Nord.

Ola Snortheim has played in the following Norwegian bands:
Blaupunkt
Cirkus Modern
De Press
Langsomt Mot Nord
Lonely Crowd
Montasje
Norske Gutter
Spastisk Ekstase
Sterk, Naken og Biltyvene
Streethawks
The Tourettes

References

Sources in Norwegian 
 Ola Snortheim Wikipedia
 Ola Snortheim Rockipedia

External links 
 Ola Snortheim's discography at Discogs
 Langsomt Mot Nord's official web-page

1954 births
Living people
Place of birth missing (living people)